Keach is the surname of the following people:
Benjamin Keach (1640–1704), English Baptist preacher and author 
Keach's Catechism
James Keach (born 1947), American actor, producer, and director
Scott Keach (born 1965), Australian equestrian
 Stacy Keach Jr. (born 1941), American actor, brother of James 
 Stacy Keach Sr. (1914–2003), American actor, father of James and Stacy Jr. 

English-language surnames